Brocchinia paniculata is a species of plant in the genus Brocchinia. This species is native to Colombia and Venezuela.

References

paniculata
Flora of Venezuela
Flora of Colombia
Plants described in 1830